Giovanni Fontana (Melide, 1540 – Rome, 1614) was a Dominican friar and late-Mannerist architect, as well as brother of Domenico Fontana.

Fontana built one of the most important rural villas of the Roman Campagna in 1601-1605 for the Aldobrandini family. Castello di Torrenova was originally a medieval farmhouse that Fontana enlarged and embellished with Renaissance details and crenellated walls. Next to the castle a small late Renaissance church was built for Saint Clement, the patron saint of the Aldobrandini Pope, Clement VIII. He also undertook some engineering projects, such as the draining of the Rieti Valley which was commissioned to him by pope Clement VIII in 1596.

References

External links
Giovanni Baglione, Giovanni Battista Passari, Le vite de' pittori, scultori, architetti, ed intagliatori

1540 births
1614 deaths
Italian Dominicans
16th-century Italian architects
17th-century Italian architects
Italian Renaissance architects
Architects from Lazio
Architects from Ticino